Fukui Prefectural Koshi High School (福井県立高志高等学校, Fukui Kenritsu Koshi Kōtō Gakkō) is a high school in Fukui, Fukui, Japan, founded in 1948. The school is operated by the Fukui Prefectural Board of Education. As of April 2014, 1061 students (554 male, 507 female) were enrolled. In 2003 it was selected as a Super Science High School (SSH) for five years by MEXT of Japan. This designation was renewed in 2008 and again in 2013.

Courses
General Course (full-time)
Science and Mathematics Course (full-time)

Notable alumni
Kazuo Kawasaki, design director, Ph.D in Medicine
Akira Satō, former member of the House of Representatives of Japan
Hiroshi Takeshima, enka singer
Shin'ichi Higashimura, mayor of Fukui

Access
The high school is about a 15-minute walk from Fukui Station.

Sister school
George Washington High School, San Francisco, USA

See also
List of high schools in Prefecture

External links
Official Website 

High schools in Fukui Prefecture
Schools in Fukui Prefecture
Educational institutions established in 1948
1948 establishments in Japan
Fukui (city)